Abhay Kushwaha alias Abhay Kumar Sinha is a former Member of Legislative Assembly for Tikari (Vidhan Sabha constituency) in the Gaya district of Bihar. He is a member of Janata Dal (United) who won the 2015 Legislative Assembly election to the Tekari constituency by defeating Anil Kumar of Hindustani Awam Morcha, a political party headed by erstwhile  member of Janata Dal (United), Jitan Ram Manjhi. In the 2015 election he defeated Anil Kumar, who joined Hindustani Awami Morcha leaving his former party Janata Dal (United) by a large margin. While Abhay secured 86975 votes, Anil managed to get 55162 votes only.

Life and political career
Born to Ramvriksha Prasad on 5 June 1972, Abhay is also active in the business. He owns Ply and Bricks plant. He is married to Kumari Anjali Bharti, and is a father of two children. 
Abhay entered into mainstream politics in 2000. Prior to his entry in state level politics, he had been a Mukhia of Kujapi village in Gaya district of Bihar. He had also occupied several other important posts in the Janata Dal (United) including the post of district president of JD (U) for Gaya and secretary of the organisation for the Gaya district. He finally beat Anil Kumar to become the Member of Legislative Assembly from the Tekari seat in 2015. In 2018 the leadership of JD (U) appointed him as the Bihar state president of the youth wing of the party. He replaced Santosh Kushwaha on this post. In 2020 Bihar Assembly Election Janata Dal (United) made Abhay the candidate from Belaganj Assembly instead of his constituency Tekari.

In 2020 Bihar assembly elections riding upon the wave of anti incumbency due to growing discontent against JD (U),   Surendra Prasad Yadav of Rashtriya Janata Dal defeated Abhay.

Controversies
Prior to the Bihar Assembly Elections 2015, Kushwaha was caught on camera while dancing with a bar girl on an obscene song. In the video he was seen shaking himself and showering notes on the bar dancer, being fully drunk. The opposition and media highlighted the issue to counter his candidacy for the Tekari seat he was going to contest. In 2020 Bihar Assembly Election, Abhay was among the politicians with most number of criminal cases against them. According to a report of Dainik Bhaskar he had a total of 14 criminal cases against him which included looting and creating hindrance in government contract works.

References

External links
Watch: JD(U) candidate for Bihar polls courts controversy, pole-dances with girl on stage
Video of JD(U) candidate pole dancing goes viral right before #BiharPolls

Janata Dal (United) politicians
Living people
Criminals from Bihar
1972 births
Bihar MLAs 2015–2020
People from Gaya district